William Wilkinson (5 July 1859 – 6 October 1940) was an English cricketer. Wilkinson's was a batting style is unknown, though it is known he bowled right-arm fast-medium. He was born at Kimberley, Nottinghamshire.

Wilkinson had told Nottinghamshire that his date of birth was 1869, in order to appear younger so as to persuade Nottinghamshire to take him on.  He made his first-class debut for the county against the Marylebone Cricket Club at Lord's in 1892. He made four further first-class appearances for the county, the last of which came against Lancashire at Old Trafford in the 1893 County Championship. In his five first-class appearances, he took 5 wickets at an average of 26.60, with best figures of 3/41.  With the bat, he scored a total of 34 runs at an average of 6.80, with a high score of 16 not out.

He died at Nottingham, Nottinghamshire, on 6 October 1940.

References

External links
William Wilkinson at ESPNcricinfo
William Wilkinson at CricketArchive

1859 births
1940 deaths
People from Kimberley, Nottinghamshire
Cricketers from Nottinghamshire
English cricketers
Nottinghamshire cricketers